Paul Gerritsen, (born 8 December 1984) is a New Zealand rower. He was a member of the world champion under-23 coxed four in 2006 also winning a bronze medal at the senior world championships the same year.

Early life
Gerritsen was born in Cambridge, New Zealand and attended St Paul's Collegiate School in nearby Hamilton. He started rowing with the school club in 2000, where he was coached by three time Olympian Ian Wright.

In 2002 and 2003  Gerritsen was part of the U19 Eight that won the Maadi Cup – the first two wins in the school's history.

International rowing

In 2006 Gerritsen was selected as the number three oarsman in the New Zealand coxed four, along with James Dallinger, Steven Cottle, Dane Boswell and cox Daniel Quigley. They won gold at the FISA Under 23 World Champs in Hazewinkel, Belgium, and Bronze at the World Championships in Eton, UK.

References

New Zealand male rowers
New Zealand people of Dutch descent
1984 births
Living people
Sportspeople from Cambridge, New Zealand
World Rowing Championships medalists for New Zealand
People educated at St Paul's Collegiate School